Semenivka is an urban-type settlement in Poltava Oblast (province) of Ukraine. It was formerly the administrative center of Semenivka Raion, but now administrated within Kremenchuk Raion. Population:

History
Semenivka was founded in the 16th century on the place of horse post station. It was named after Semen Rodzianko.

References 

 
Urban-type settlements in Kremenchuk Raion
Khorolsky Uyezd